Upheaval Dome is an enigmatic geological structure in San Juan County, Utah, United States, that has been variously interpreted as a meteorite impact structure or a salt dome.

Description 

The crater is clearly visible on the surface as light and dark brown concentric rings.

Stratigraphically, the oldest formation exposed in the center of the dome is the Permian Organ Rock Shale.  This is overlain by the Permian White Rim Sandstone.  Both are sometimes considered part of the Cutler Formation. Overlying these are the Triassic Moenkopi Formation (which is bounded top and bottom by unconformities), the Chinle Formation, the cliff-forming Wingate Sandstone, the Kayenta Formation, and the crossbedded Triassic-Jurassic Navajo Sandstone.

Structurally, the dome is anomalous.  Most of the rock strata of Canyonlands National Park are flat-lying or gently dipping with the exception of a series of   linear salt walls and associated synclines. Upheaval Dome is a circular, dome shaped structure.  Some strata near the center are nearly vertical in orientation.  Dips of 70 degrees have been measured in the Kayenta Formation on the U-shaped plateau surrounding the center of the structure.  A syncline surrounds the center, where the axis forms a complete circle approximately two miles across.  The syncline is primarily visible in the Navajo Sandstone. Another anticline has been mapped to the north of this ring syncline, which is also concentric with it.

There were two well-known theories as to the origin of the upheaval. One theory was the upheaval is a salt dome, an anticlinal structure which occurs when a salt diapir is pushed up by the weight of overlying rocks.

The other theory is an eroded impact crater, like the much younger Meteor Crater near Winslow, Arizona. In the 1990s, a team of geologists and seismologists from NASA and the University of Nevada at Reno performed a detailed study that included seismic refraction and rock mapping. The results of this study support the meteorite theory.  In 2008, it was announced that shocked quartz was discovered, although this was very limited and the origin remains unresolved.

Gallery

References

External links 

 Upheaval dome on PASSC Earth Impact Database
 U.S. Dept. of the Interior, National Park Service Upheaval Dome
 Shocked Quartz discovery
 Aerial Exploration of the Upheaval Dome impact crater

Impact craters of the United States
Jurassic impact craters
Canyonlands National Park
Landforms of San Juan County, Utah